Nava is a given name. In Hebrew and Arabic its meaning is "pretty." Notable people with the name include:

Nava Arad (1938–2022), Israeli politician
Nava Ashraf, Canadian economist and academic
Nava Boker (born 1970), Israeli journalist and politician
Nava Lubelski (born 1968), American artist
Nava Macmel-Atir (born 1964), Israeli author, playwright and poet
Nava Semel (1954–2017), Israeli author, playwright and screenwriter
Nava Starr (born 1949), Canadian chess player

See also
Neva (name)

References

Arabic feminine given names
Hebrew feminine given names